In September 2011, DC Comics relaunched their entire line of publications, dubbing the new publishing initiative as The New 52. The initiative consisted of a new imprint of titles, all labeled with "The New 52" logo, as well as creating a rebooted DC Universe post-"Flashpoint" that saw characters from the former WildStorm and Vertigo imprints being absorbed into the main DC Comics line. The intent was to publish 52 ongoing titles each month across the DC Universe. However, DC has also counted one-shots, miniseries and maxiseries in that number.

In June 2015, following the conclusion of the Convergence miniseries, "The New 52" branding and imprint were discontinued, although the continuity continued under a new initiative, "DC You". In February 2016, DC announced the Rebirth initiative, bringing an end to the New 52 beginning in June 2016. Gotham Academy: Second Semester was the final title to release from the New 52, with the final issue releasing in August 2017. An additional Earth-2 title was announced to replace Earth-2: Society, but details were not provided.

DC released a total of 111 ongoing titles during The New 52. To expand The New 52 universe, DC had also released 34 one-shots, 32 miniseries and four maxiseries, with one ongoing series planned. One ongoing series was planned but did not release before Rebirth took effect in June 2016. Additionally, another ongoing series was planned but cancelled, with its concepts merged into another title.

Imprint titles

The ongoing titles under The New 52 imprint were organized under seven different "families", grouping similar characters or themes within the books together. These families were: "Justice League"; "Batman"; "Superman"; "Green Lantern"; "Young Justice"; "The Edge"; and "The Dark". However, by the release of the October 2013 solicitations, DC was no longer grouping the titles by these families, instead releasing one larger solicit, titled "The New 52 Group".

From September 2011 until June 2015, DC released 93 ongoing titles under the imprint across multiple "wave" releases, and to expand The New 52 universe, also released 21 one-shots, 17 miniseries and three maxiseries. DC used the "wave" format of introducing new titles, which occasionally corresponded with titles being canceled, to "constantly refresh the line". Additionally, in subsequent Septembers following the launch, DC featured unique publishing initiatives to commemorate the relaunch.

Post-imprint titles
In February 2015, it was revealed that after the Convergence miniseries in June 2015, DC would no longer use the "New 52" name to brand their books; however the continuity established in September 2011 would continue. Dan DiDio stated, "In this new era of storytelling, story will trump continuity as we continue to empower creators to tell the best stories". Jim Lee added, "Rather than having 52 books all in the same continuity, and really focusing on keeping a universe that's tightly connected and has super-internal consistency, and really one flavor, we've really broken it up. We'll have a core line of about 25 books that will have that internal consistency, that will consist of our best-selling books. But then the rest of the line, about 24 titles, will be allowed to really shake things up a little bit." The new titles would be “reinventing key characters”, such as Black Canary, Cyborg, Bizarro, and Starfire, with a new “contemporary tonality to ensure a diverse offering of comic books.” In the initial "relaunch", 24 new publications joined 25 existing publications from before Convergence, with new titles continuing to be added. In March 2015, DiDio revealed there would not be an "overarching brand on this" stating the relaunch was just "DC Comics, pure and simple." However, in May 2015, DC announced the advertising campaign "DC You" for the relaunch, highlighting the four themes of characters, talent, stories and fans. The initiative, which began in DC's print and digital comics on May 20, before transitioning to other digital content on June 3, was featured on print inserts and ads, as well as on the DC Comics website and across social media with a special hashtag.

In February 2016, DC Comics announced its Rebirth initiative, a line-wide relaunch of its titles to begin in June 2016. Along with a number of existing New 52 titles relaunching with new #1s and the cancellation of others, DC planned to reintroduced many of the familiar concepts for characters, such as legacy, from the pre-Flashpoint continuity that had been lost with the New 52, by creating a new DC Universe that built "on everything that's been published since Action Comics #1 up thru The New 52."

Since the "relaunch", DC has released an additional 18 ongoing series, as well as 15 miniseries, 13 one-shots, and one maxiseries, with one ongoing series planned. One ongoing series was planned but did not release before Rebirth took effect in June 2016. Additionally, another ongoing series was planned but cancelled, with its concepts merged into another title.

Continuing titles

These titles were published before Convergence and continued their previous numbering, as opposed to being renumbered or relaunched in June 2015.

New titles

Upcoming

Discontinued

Unpublished and cancelled
Mystik U, written by Alisa Kwitney with art from Mauricet, would have focused on a college for magic people, featuring Rose Psychic and Cain and Abel. Kwitney original stated the title would debut in October 2015, but it was not released before Rebirth took effect in June 2016. The title was eventually solicited in August 2017 for a November 2017 release as a "prestige-format limited series" outside DC Rebirth continuity. The series now featured art from Mike Norton, and centered on Zatanna, Sebastian Faust, Enchantress, Pia Morales and Sargon the Sorceror.

Dark Universe was announced with the other new DC You titles, as a continuation of Justice League Dark, with James Tynion IV and Ming Doyle working on the title. However, in May 2015, Tynion revealed the book was no longer being developed, with Doyle and him "folding a lot of" their ideas for the series into their Constantine: The Hellblazer run.

One-shots
In May 2015, DC released eight-page original stories for free in the monthly titles of "Convergence" as well as on DC's website and other digital distributors such as comiXology. The stories provided a sampling of the new titles launching in June as a way to generate excitement for the titles and for readers to "get a chance to read these books, see the different styles of art, read the different types of stories, see how [DC] plan[s] to interpret [their] characters in a new way".

Miniseries

Maxiseries

Collected editions

References
Notes
1. For additional creative team information, see each title's individual article.
2. Creative team for initial month of publication. For additional creative team information, see title's individual article.

References

External links

 DC Comics comic page

Lists of comics by DC Comics